John McDonald may refer to:

Politics

Australian
John McDonald (Western Australian politician) (1869–1934), member of the Western Australian Legislative Assembly, 1911–1914
John McDonald (Victorian politician) (1898–1977), Premier of the state of Victoria, Australia, 1950–1952
John Joseph McDonald (1904–1959), Australian Labor Party Member of the Tasmania House of Assembly
John Young McDonald (1837–1917), member of the Victorian Legislative Council

Canadian
John McDonald (1787–1860), businessman and political figure in Upper Canada and Canada West
John Anthony McDonald (1875–1948), manufacturer, financier and Canadian Senator
John Alexander McDonald (politician) (1889–1962), farmer and political figure in Nova Scotia, Canada
John Archibald McDonald (Nova Scotia politician) (1851–1925), lawyer and political figure in Nova Scotia, Canada
John Archibald McDonald (Saskatchewan politician) (1865–1929), banker and political figure in Saskatchewan, Canada
John Lawrence McDonald (1894–1969), Ontario farmer and political figure, represented Stormont in the Legislative Assembly of Ontario, 1943–1951
John Stevenson McDonald (1828–1917), Scottish-born Ontario farmer and political figure, represented Bruce Centre in the Legislative Assembly of Ontario, 1894–1898
John W. McDonald (1878–1950), leader of the Alberta Liberal Party

New Zealand
John McDonald (mayor), mayor of Dunedin, New Zealand, 1908–1909

United States
John McDonald (Maine politician) (1773–1826), State Senator
John McDonald (Maryland politician) (1837–1917), U.S. Representative from Maryland
John McDonald (Ohio politician), former member of the Ohio House of Representatives
John D. McDonald (politician) (1816–1900), Wisconsin State Assemblyman
John C. McDonald (1930–2011), Louisiana State University chancellor
John S. McDonald (1864–1941), Justice of the Michigan Supreme Court
John T. McDonald III (born 1962), member of the New York State Assembly
John Warlick McDonald (1922–2019), U.S. Ambassador

Sportsmen
Jock McDonald (fl. 1920s), Scottish footballer for Airdrieonians and Everton 
John McDonald (archer) (born 1965), Canadian archer
John McDonald (infielder) (born 1974), Major League Baseball infielder
John McDonald (pitcher) (1883–1950), Major League Baseball pitcher for the Washington Senators in 1907
John McDonald (bobsleigh), American bobsledder who competed in the late 1940s
John McDonald (rugby league), Australian rugby league footballer, coach and administrator
John McDonald (English cricketer) (1882–1961), English cricketer
John McDonald (New Zealand cricketer) (born 1931), New Zealand cricketer
John McDonald (American football) (1900–?), American football player
John McDonald (ice hockey) (1921–1990), professional ice hockey player
John McDonald (footballer, born 1921) (1921–1999), football player for Tranmere Rovers

Other people
John McDonald (journalist) (1906–1998), American journalist and writer
John D. MacDonald (1916–1986), American mystery author
John P. McDonald (1922–1993), American librarian
John R. McDonald, Canadian historian and writer
John Wade McDonald, American Civil War soldier and Medal of Honor recipient on List of American Civil War Medal of Honor recipients: M–P
John McDonald (poet) (1846–?), poet from County Leitrim in Ireland
John McDonald (entrepreneur), restaurateur and entrepreneur based in New York City
John B. McDonald, American construction businessman
John Bacon McDonald (1859–1927), United States Army officer
John McDonald (Union Army general) (1832–1912)
John Randal McDonald (1922–2003), architect who worked in the 1950s and 1960s
W. John McDonald, Canadian physicist and academic administrator

See also
John Macdonald (disambiguation)
John Macdonell (disambiguation)
Jack McDonald (disambiguation)
John McDonnell (disambiguation)
Jackie McDonald (born 1947), Ulster Defence Association brigadier for South Belfast
Jon-Marc McDonald (born 1976), American political activist